Sketches of Japan is an album by jazz pianist Toshiko Akiyoshi. It was released in 1999 by Nippon Crown Records.

Recording and music
The album was recorded over three sessions: at Studio A, Avatar Studios, New York City on January 12–13 and February 8, 1999; and at CRS Recording Studio No. 1, Tokyo on November 17, 1998. Most of the music is played by a trio, and five of the seven tracks were written by Akiyoshi.

Track listing 
"Kyoto Paradox" - 6:24 
"Children In The Temple Ground" - 8:44 
"Tsurusaki Odori" - 6:33 
"Mari To Tonosama" - 6:14 
"Repose" - 8:19 
"Prayer" - 6:44 
"Grooving in Yokohama" - 6:34

Personnel
Toshiko Akiyoshi – piano 
Philippe Aerts – bass 
Eddie Marshall – drums (except Track 7)
Carl Allen – drums (Track 6)
Tomonao Hara – trumpet (Track 7)
Jō Yamada – alto saxophone (Track 7)

References

Toshiko Akiyoshi albums
1999 albums